The eleventh edition of the Men's Football Tournament at the Pan American Games was held in Havana, Cuba from August 4 to August 13, 1991. After the preliminary round there was a knock-out stage.

After CONMEBOL boycotted the games, South American teams (including title holder Brazil) did not participate in the competition. United States, coached by Lothar Osiander, won their first Pan American title. The United States included a number of players from the highly successful U-20 World Championship squad of 1989, including Brad Friedel, Joe-Max Moore, Steve Snow, Manny Lagos, Yari Allnutt, Kasey Keller, Mike Burns, Cobi Jones and Claudio Reyna.

First round

Group A

Group B

Final round

Bracket

Semifinals

Bronze Medal match

Gold Medal match

Medalists

Goalscorers

References

Pan American Games
Events at the 1991 Pan American Games
1991
International association football competitions hosted by Cuba
Pan
Pan